Tongdaeng, with variant spellings like Thong Daeng (7 November 1998 – 26 December 2015), was a female copper-colored mixed breed dog and one of the pets owned by King Bhumibol Adulyadej of Thailand.

Life

The king adopted Tongdaeng in 1998 from the litter of a stray dog that had been taken in by a medical center he had recently dedicated. She was nursed by Mae Mali, a former stray who was adopted by the king earlier.  Her name means "copper" in Thai. A commemorative block of four postage stamps featuring Tongdaeng was issued by Thailand Post in 2006.

Bhumibol called her "A common dog who is uncommon", and in 2002 wrote an affectionate biography of her titled "The Story of Tongdaeng (เรื่อง ทองแดง)". The book is commonly referred to as a parable on many social topics. For instance, the King wrote that "Tongdaeng is a respectful dog with proper manners; she is humble and knows protocol. She would always sit lower than the King; even when he pulls her up to embrace her, Tongdaeng would lower herself down on the floor, her ears in a respectful drooping position, as if she would say, 'I don't dare.'"

All the names of the dogs owned by the King start with the word "Thong" (lit. gold).

The 84-page book, published with both Thai and English text, quickly sold out of its first edition of 100,000 in Thailand. Since demand was so high, the book became an esteemed gift, and was reprinted many times.

A statue of Tongdaeng was created for the Royal Crematorium of King Bhumibol. Her chest is adorned with Jasmine motif, a representation of "Mother's Love" as Jasmine or "Mali" is the flower for Thailand' Mother's Day as well as the name of  Tongdaeng's adoptive mother.

Protection by lèse majesté law

Thanakorn Siripaiboon, a 27-year-old factory worker, was charged in 2015 with insulting the King through a "sarcastic" post about Tongdaeng on Facebook, under the lèse majesté law in Thailand. His lawyer, Anon Nampa, informed the International New York Times that the charge "had not detailed the precise insult towards the animal". The Bangkok-based printer of the International New York Times removed the story from the 14 December 2015 print edition of the paper, just 12 days before Tongdaeng's death. He was released on bond after spending 90 days in prison. If convicted, Siripaiboon could have faced up to a maximum of 37 years in prison. His current location and the status of his case are unknown as of June 2018.

According to the BBC, a prosecutor said Siripaiboon had posted several photos of the dog on Facebook in a manner which appeared to mock the King, and in addition had been charged with posting the "like" button next to a doctored photo of the Thai monarch, which had been posted by another Facebook user. The case was finally dropped.

In media
A film based on Tongdaeng's biography, Khun Tongdaeng: The Inspirations (คุณทองแดงดิอินสไปเรชันส์), was released in November 2015.

See also
 Fufu (dog)
 List of individual dogs

References

Further reading
 Bhumibol Adulyadej. The Story of Tongdaeng. Amarin, Bangkok. 2004. 

1998 animal births
2015 animal deaths
Individual dogs in politics
Lèse majesté in Thailand
Bhumibol Adulyadej
Pets of the Chakri dynasty